The Vanuatu national rugby union team represents Vanuatu in the sport of rugby union. The team is classified as a tier three nation by the International Rugby Board (IRB), and has yet to qualify for a Rugby World Cup. Its international debut was in 1966. The team is nicknamed the Tuskers, after the pig tusks prized as currency in some parts of the country. The tusks also appear on the country's flag.

History

Vanuatu was involved in the Oceania qualifying tournaments for the 2007 Rugby World Cup in France. It was a part of the Round 1a group, with the Solomon Islands and Papua New Guinea. It won its first match at home against the Solomon Islands, lost the second match away to Papua New Guinea 97 to 3, and did not proceed to the next round.

Record

World Cup

Overall

In late 2012, due to management issues, the Vanuatu rugby team was suspended by the IRB for failure to report about the country's use of money and development of the sport within the country.

See also

 FORU Oceania Cup
 2007 Rugby World Cup – Oceania qualification
 Vanuatu Rugby Football Union
 Rugby union in Vanuatu
 Vanuatu national under-20 rugby union team

External links
 Vanuatu on rugbydata.com

Oceanian national rugby union teams
Rugby union in Vanuatu
National sports teams of Vanuatu